East Timor–Kosovo relations refer to the bilateral relations between East Timor and Kosovo.

History
East Timor recognised Kosovo as an independent, sovereign state on 20 September 2012. The two states established formal diplomatic relations on 9 March 2022.

Both countries have previously been under United Nations administration, East Timor between 1999 and 2002 and Kosovo between 1999 and unilaterally declaring independence in 2008.

Representation
Kosovo is represented in East Timor by a non-resident ambassador based in Canberra, Australia.

Notes

References

External links
Embassy of Kosovo in Canberra

Kosovo
Bilateral relations of Kosovo